South Elmsall is a civil parish in the metropolitan borough of the City of Wakefield, West Yorkshire, England.  The parish contains five listed buildings that are recorded in the National Heritage List for England.  All the listed buildings are designated at Grade II, the lowest of the three grades, which is applied to "buildings of national importance and special interest".  The parish contains the village of South Elmsall and the surrounding area, and the listed buildings consist of three farmhouses, a barn, and a war memorial.


Buildings

References

Citations

Sources

Lists of listed buildings in West Yorkshire